American Revolution Statuary is a group of fourteen statues in Washington, D.C., listed with the National Register of Historic Places. The statues are scattered across Washington, mainly in squares and traffic circles, with four statues of European officers displayed in Lafayette Square, across from the White House

In accordance with Executive Order 11593, by President Richard Nixon, the National Park Service surveyed and registered Statuary of people of the American Revolution in Washington, D.C. to aid in their preservation.

All but one of the statues are cast in bronze.  Franklin's statue was carved in marble. Five of the statues depict American military men, two American politicians (Franklin and Witherspoon), and an eighth statue, that of Artemas Ward, depicts a military man who was also governor of Massachusetts. Five statues depict European officers who aided the American cause, and the one of Edmund Burke, a British politician who spoke out for the American cause. The U.S. Congress authorized the original placement of all the statues, and all but four (Burke, Franklin, Hale, and Witherspoon) were fully paid for with federal funds.

Statues
Lieutenant General George Washington — 
Benjamin Franklin — 
Major General Nathanael Greene —  
Captain Nathan Hale — 
John Paul Jones Memorial — 
Commodore John Barry — 
Doctor John Witherspoon — 
Edmund Burke — 
General Casimir Pulaski — 
Major General Marquis Gilbert de Lafayette — 
Brigadier General Thaddeus Kosciuszko — 
Major General Friedrich Wilhelm von Steuben — 
Major General Comte Jean de Rochambeau — 
General Artemas Ward —

See also

 Civil War Monuments in Washington, D.C.
 National Register of Historic Places listings in Washington, D.C.

References

 
Neoclassical sculptures